Udmurt is a Permic language spoken by the Udmurt people who are native to Udmurtia. As a Uralic language, it is distantly related to languages such as Finnish, Estonian, Mansi, Khanty, and Hungarian. The Udmurt language is co-official with Russian within Udmurtia.

It is written using the Cyrillic alphabet with the addition of five characters not used in the Russian alphabet: Ӝ/ӝ, Ӟ/ӟ, Ӥ/ӥ, Ӧ/ӧ, and Ӵ/ӵ. Together with the Komi and Permyak languages, it constitutes the Permic grouping of the Uralic family. Among outsiders, it has traditionally been referred to by its Russian exonym, Votyak. Udmurt has borrowed vocabulary from neighboring languages, mainly from Tatar and Russian.

In 2010, as per the Russian census, there were around 324,000 speakers of the language in the country, out of the ethnic population of roughly 554,000. Ethnologue estimated that there were 550,000 native speakers (77%) out of an ethnic population of 750,000 in the former Russian SFSR (1989 census), a decline of roughly 41% in 21 years.

Dialects
Udmurt varieties can be grouped in three broad dialect groups:
 Northern Udmurt, spoken along the Cheptsa River
 Southern Udmurt
 Besermyan, spoken by the strongly Turkified Besermyans

A continuum of intermediate dialects between Northern and Southern Udmurt is found, and literary Udmurt includes features from both areas. Besermyan is more sharply distinguished.

The differences between the dialects are regardless not major and mainly involve differences in vocabulary, largely attributable to the stronger influence of Tatar in the southern end of the Udmurt-speaking area. A few differences in morphology and phonology still exist as well; for example:
 Southern Udmurt has an accusative ending -ыз , contrasting with northern -ты .
 Southwestern Udmurt distinguishes an eighth vowel phoneme .

Orthography

Udmurt is written using a modified version of the Russian Cyrillic alphabet:

Phonology
Unlike other Uralic languages such as Finnish and Hungarian, Udmurt does not distinguish between long and short vowels and does not have vowel harmony.

Consonants

The consonants  are restricted to loanwords, and are traditionally replaced by  respectively. As in Hungarian, Udmurt exhibits regressive voicing and devoicing assimilations (the last element determines the assimilation), but with some exceptions (mostly to distinguish minimal pairs by voicing).

Vowels

Grammar

 Udmurt is an agglutinating language. It uses affixes to express possession, to specify mode, time, and so on.

No gender distinction is made in nouns or personal pronouns.

Cases 
Udmurt has fifteen cases: eight grammatical cases and seven locative cases.

There is no congruency between adjectives and nouns in neutral Udmurt noun phrases; in other words, there is no adjective declension as in the inessive noun phrase  ("in a big village"; cf. Finnish inessive phrase , in which  "large" is inflected according to the head noun).

*Of all the locative cases, personal pronouns can only inflect in the allative (also called approximative).

Plural 
There are two types of nominal plurals in Udmurt. One is the plural for nouns -/- and the other is the plural for adjectives -/-.

Nominal plural 
The noun is always in plural. In attributive plural phrases, the adjective is not required to be in the plural:

The plural marker always comes before other endings (i.e. cases and possessive suffixes) in the morphological structure of plural nominal.

Predicative plural 
As in Hungarian and Mordvinic languages, if the subject is plural, the adjective is always plural when it functions as the sentence's predicative:

Udmurt pronouns are inflected much in the same way that their referent nouns are. However, personal pronouns are only inflected in the grammatical cases and cannot be inflected in the locative cases.

Pronouns

Personal pronouns 
Udmurt personal pronouns are used to refer to human beings only. However, the third person singular can be referred to as it. The nominative case of personal pronouns are listed in the following table:

Interrogative pronouns 
Udmurt interrogative pronouns inflect in all cases. However, the inanimate interrogative pronouns 'what' in the locative cases have the base form -. The nominative case of interrogative pronouns are listed in the following table:

Verbs 
Udmurt verbs are divided into two conjugation groups, both having the infinitive marker .

There are three verbal moods in Udmurt: indicative, conditional and imperative. There is also an optative mood used in certain dialects. The indicative mood has four tenses: present, future, and two past tenses. In addition there are four past tense structures which include auxiliary verbs. Verbs are negated by use of an auxiliary negative verb that conjugates with personal endings.

The basic verbal personal markers in Udmurt are (with some exceptions):

Syntax 
Udmurt is an SOV language.

Lexicon
Depending on the style, about 10 to 30 percent of the Udmurt lexicon consists of loanwords.  Many loanwords are from the Tatar language, which has also strongly influenced Udmurt phonology and syntax. 

The Udmurt language, along with the Tatar language, influenced the language of the Udmurt Jews, in the dialects of which the words of Finno-Ugric and Turkic origin there were recorded.

Media in Udmurt
Eurovision runners-up Buranovskiye Babushki, a pop group composed of Udmurt grandmothers, sing mostly in Udmurt.

The romantic comedy film Berry-Strawberry, a joint Polish-Udmurt production, is in the Udmurt language.

In 2013 the film company "Inwis kinopottonni" produced a film in the Udmurt language called Puzkar ("nest").

The Bible was first completely translated into Udmurt in 2013.

Bibliography

References

External links

Udmurtology: Udmurt Language, History and Culture
Literature
The First Udmurt Forum
Udmurt State University (has Udmurt Language Program for English speakers)
Udmurt language, alphabet and pronunciation
 Vladimir Napolskikh. Review of Eberhard Winkler, Udmurt, München 2001 (Languages of the World. Materials 212)
 Udmurt – Finnish/Komi Zyrian dictionary (robust finite-state, open-source)
 Learning Udmurt words
BGN/PCGN romanization tool for Udmurt

 
Permic languages
Languages of Russia
Agglutinative languages